Pegvaliase, sold under the brand name Palynziq, is a medication for the treatment of the genetic disease phenylketonuria. Chemically, it is a pegylated derivative of the enzyme phenylalanine ammonia-lyase that metabolizes phenylalanine to reduce its blood levels.

It was approved by the Food and Drug Administration for use in the United States in 2018. The U.S. Food and Drug Administration (FDA) considers it to be a first-in-class medication.

References

External links 
 

Drugs acting on the gastrointestinal system and metabolism
Recombinant proteins
Orphan drugs